After the Yenne Saastra, at the beginning of the  Hindu marriage rituals, auspicious omens are looked for. When pleasing or agreeable omens are observed, Shakunamanojaya (which literally means the conquering of one's mind by omens) is said to be achieved. The way is then clear for the performance of the next ritual, which is Balle Mallarada Puje.

Hindu wedding rituals